This is a list of casinos in Idaho.

List of casinos

See also 
List of casinos in the United States
List of casino hotels

References

External links 

List of Idaho Casinos

 
Casinos
Idaho
Native American casinos